The largest mid Miocene deposits in Ukraine are situated near Ternopil city. Here several species of corals, crabs, mollusks and whales have been found. One of the most interesting discoveries is a daira speciosa carapace with a haliotis shell. Probably it had symbiotic relationship with this crab.

13 million years ago the area was part of a shallow sea called the Paratethys, which is why there were found few vertebrate fossils. Grains of sedimentary rock were too large to preserve soft tissues or small and delicate bones. However, shells and crabs carapaces, because they were hard enough, survived.

Most of the fossils found there are displayed in the Kyiv paleontological museum.

List of fossil species
Echinoids
Euptagus

Crabs
Daira speciosa
Xantho moldavicus

Mollusks
Lithophaga sp.
Turbo sp.
Haliotis volhynica
Conus sp.
Cypraea sp.

Corals
Unidentified species

Whales
Phocoena sp.

See also
Miocene

References

External links 
 Miocene crabs. ''Palaeotm.com
 Kyiv paleontological museum 

Miocene animals